is a Japanese motorcycle racer. He has competed in the GP125, GP250  and ST600 classes of the All Japan Road Race Championship.

Career statistics

Grand Prix motorcycle racing

By season

Races by year
(key)

References

External links

1985 births
Living people
Japanese motorcycle racers
125cc World Championship riders
250cc World Championship riders